Brilliant Black BN, Brilliant Black PN, Brilliant Black A, Black PN, Food Black 1, Naphthol Black, C.I. Food Black 1, or C.I. 28440, is a synthetic black diazo dye. It is soluble in water. It usually comes as tetrasodium salt. It has the appearance of solid, fine powder or granules. Calcium and potassium salts are allowed as well.

When used as a food dye, its E number is E151. It is used in food decorations and coatings, desserts, sweets, ice cream, mustard, red fruit jams, soft drinks, flavored milk drinks, fish paste, lumpfish caviar and other foods.

E151 has been banned in the United States, Switzerland, Japan. It is approved in the European Union. It was banned in Norway until 2001 when it was unbanned due to trade relationships with other countries.

It is used for staining animal by-products in category 2.

References

Food colorings
Azo dyes
Organic sodium salts
Acetamides
Naphthalenesulfonates
Benzenesulfonates
E-number additives